Environment Directorate may refer to: 

 Directorate-General for the Environment (European Commission), environmental agency of the European Commission
 Norwegian Directorate for Nature Management
 Enterprise, Environment and Digital Directorates, a Scottish directorate
 Environment Directorates, a former Scottish directorate